Haladaptatus (common abbreviation Hap.) is a genus of halophilic archaea in the family of Halobacteriaceae.
The members of Haladaptatus thrive in environments with salt concentrations approaching saturation

References

Further reading

Scientific journals

Scientific books

Scientific databases

External links

Archaea genera